Lucas Catarina (born 26 August 1996) is a Monégasque tennis player.

Catarina has a career-high ATP singles ranking of No. 341 achieved on 11 June 2018. He also has a career-high ATP doubles ranking of No. 526 achieved on 27 May 2019. He has won six singles titles on the ITF pro circuit tour, along with two doubles titles. He played his first ATP main-draw match in April 2018 at the Monte Carlo Rolex Masters after receiving a wild card into the main draw. He lost against former world No. 3 Milos Raonic. Also in 2018, he won the singles silver medal at the Mediterranean Games. Catarina has won eight Futures titles.

Catarina represents Monaco in the Davis Cup. He defeated Latvian tennis player Rūdolfs Mednis in his first rubber.

Challenger and Futures/World Tennis Tour finals

Singles: 22 (10–12)

Doubles: 3 (2–1)

References

External links

1996 births
Living people
Monegasque male tennis players
Competitors at the 2013 Mediterranean Games
Competitors at the 2018 Mediterranean Games
Competitors at the 2022 Mediterranean Games
Mediterranean Games silver medalists for Monaco
Mediterranean Games medalists in tennis